Events from the year 1482 in Ireland.

Incumbent
 Lord: Edward IV

Events
 Thaddeus McCarthy appointed Bishop of Ross (Ireland)

Births

Deaths
 Urard Ó Maolconaire

References